Akaogiite (IMA symbol Aka) is an exceedingly rare mineral, one of the natural forms of titanium dioxide (TiO2). It is a high-pressure polymorph of TiO2, along with anatase, brookite and another high-pressure phase called "TiO2 II". Rutile is the stable polymorph of TiO2, most commonly found at standard temperatures and pressures.

Akaogiite can be found at the Nördlinger Ries Crater, a meteor crater in Germany, where the extreme pressure during the impact allowed its formation.

References

Oxide minerals
Titanium minerals
Monoclinic minerals